Locustgrove is an unincorporated community in Clark County, Ohio, United States.

References

Unincorporated communities in Clark County, Ohio
Unincorporated communities in Ohio